Borgeaud is a surname. Notable people with the surname include:
 Georges Borgeaud (1914–1998), Swiss writer and publisher
 Marius Borgeaud (1861–1924), Swiss painter
 Nelly Borgeaud (1931–2004), French film actress
 Pierre-Yves Borgeaud (born 1963), Swiss film director

See also
 Bourgeat